A Sperrbrecher (German; informally translated as "pathfinder" but literally meaning "mine barrage breaker"), was a German auxiliary ship of the First World War and the Second World War that served as a type of minesweeper, steaming ahead of other vessels through minefields and detonating them with their reinforced hull. Also used as anti-aircraft ships, the Sperrbrecher suffered heavy losses in the war.

Operational history
Sperrbrecher were used extensively by the Germans in World War I. The Imperial Fleet had a total of thirty Sperrbrecher for clearing mine streets – eight were lost during the war. Some of these ships were equipped with airplanes, such as Rio Negro, Plauen or Wigbert. In World War II officially designated as 'Special Purpose Merchant Ships', although termed by the Royal Air Force as "Heavy Flak Ship", the Sperrbrecher were converted from merchant ships for their special role, were primarily crewed by merchant seamen. Often their cargo holds were filled with buoyant material to aid in flotation in case of hitting a mine and the bows were strengthened. Ships converted to the Sperrbrecher type were usually fitted with heavy anti-aircraft armament and often carried barrage balloons.

The primary use of the Sperrbrecher was to escort other vessels through cleared paths in defensive minefields, for the purpose of detonating any mines that might have strayed into the passageways. The ships of the Sperrbrecher type were, early in the war, used to clear suspected enemy minefields by simply sailing through them. Even with the strengthened hull and buoyant material the ships suffered heavy losses and with the advent of acoustically and magnetically fused mines, they became ineffective. Later in the war the Sperrbrecher type ships were used to escort U-boats in and out of harbour.

Due to their capable dual purpose armament and respectable fire control a Sperrbrecher was also an able surface combatant, significant enough to deter the WWI-era RN escort destroyer HMS Wanderer from engaging for fear of receiving "a bloody nose".

To counter newer, magnetically fused mines, some ships of the Sperrbrecher type were equipped with a large electromagnet in their bows. Careful military intelligence work by the Royal Navy resulted in a method to defeat this method of minesweeping, sinking several Sperrbrecher through the careful fusing of mines laid as traps, their fuses desensitised to be activated only when the sweeping vessel was directly above them.

During World War II only one commander received the Knight's Cross of the Iron Cross for services on a Sperrbrecher. Korvettenkapitän of the Reserves Karl Palmgreen received the award on 3 August 1941 as commander of Sperrbrecher IX and I. After the war some Sperrbrecher were converted back to merchant duties, a number remaining in service until the 1970s.

See also

 R boat, for smaller German minesweepers
 M-class minesweeper (Germany) for larger German World War 2 minesweepers

References

Notes

Bibliography

Further reading

External links 
 Sperrbrecher, at German Navy website

Mine warfare vessels of the Kriegsmarine
World War II mine warfare vessels of Germany

da:Minestryger#Sperbrecher
de:Minenabwehrfahrzeug#Sperrbrecher